Kuratite, named for Dr. Gero Kurat (1938–2009), meteorite researcher and Curator of the Meteorite Collection at the Vienna Natural History Museum, was first recognized as a new mineral by the Commission on New Minerals, Nomenclature and Classification in 2014 from a small meteorite sample.

References

General references
Mineralienatlas
Kuratite: New Mineral Discovered in Meteorite

Aluminium minerals
Inosilicates
Triclinic minerals
Minerals in space group 2